Edwin Thomas Tompkins (1880 − 1940), known as Tom or Tommy Tompkins, was an English footballer who played as a forward and half back for Doncaster Rovers and Leeds City in The Football League at the beginning of the 20th century.

Tompkins signed for Doncaster for their return to the Second Division in 1904−05. He scored in his second game against Mexborough Town in the FA Cup on 3 November, and 2 days later in his League debut against Burton United. It was the joint worst season in English Football League history, Doncaster ending up bottom with just 8 points from 34 games and failing to be re-elected.

He then went to Denaby United in the Midland League for two seasons before joining Leeds City. Despite looking good in practice games, his form wasn't good and he was dropped after 11 games. At the end of the season he moved to Mexborough Town where he saw out his career back in the Midland League.

References

1880s births
1940 deaths
English footballers
Association football defenders
Doncaster Rovers F.C. players
Denaby United F.C. players
Leeds City F.C. players
Mexborough Athletic F.C. players
English Football League players
Midland Football League players